Peter Albert David Singer  (born 6 July 1946) is an Australian moral philosopher and the Ira W. DeCamp Professor of Bioethics at Princeton University. He specialises in applied ethics, approaching the subject from a secular, utilitarian perspective. He wrote the book Animal Liberation (1975), in which he argues for veganism, and the essay "Famine, Affluence, and Morality", which favours donating to help the global poor. For most of his career, he was a preference utilitarian, but he revealed in The Point of View of the Universe (2014), coauthored with Katarzyna de Lazari-Radek, that he had become a hedonistic utilitarian.

On two occasions, Singer served as chair of the philosophy department at Monash University, where he founded its Centre for Human Bioethics. In 1996 he stood unsuccessfully as a Greens candidate for the Australian Senate. In 2004 Singer was recognised as the Australian Humanist of the Year by the Council of Australian Humanist Societies. In 2005, The Sydney Morning Herald placed him among Australia's ten most influential public intellectuals. Singer is a cofounder of Animals Australia and the founder of The Life You Can Save.

Early life, education and career 

Singer's parents were Austrian Jews who immigrated to Australia from Vienna after Austria's annexation by Nazi Germany in 1938. They settled in Melbourne, where Singer was born in 1946. His grandparents were less fortunate: his paternal grandparents were taken by the Nazis to Łódź, and never heard from again; his maternal grandfather David Ernst Oppenheim (1881–1943), a teacher, died in the Theresienstadt concentration camp. Oppenheim was a member of the Vienna Psychoanalytic Society and wrote a joint article with Sigmund Freud, before joining the Adlerian Society for Individual Psychology. Singer later wrote a biography of Oppenheim.

Singer is an atheist and was raised in a prosperous, nonreligious family. His father had a successful business importing tea and coffee. His family rarely observed Jewish holidays, and Singer declined to have a Bar Mitzvah. Singer attended Preshil and later Scotch College. After leaving school, Singer studied law, history, and philosophy at the University of Melbourne, earning a bachelor's degree in 1967. He has explained that he elected to major in philosophy after his interest was piqued by discussions with his sister's then-boyfriend. 

He earned a master's degree for a thesis entitled "Why Should I Be Moral?" at the same university in 1969. He was awarded a scholarship to study at the University of Oxford and obtained from there a BPhil degree in 1971 with a thesis on civil disobedience supervised by R. M. Hare and published as a book in 1973. Singer names Hare and Australian philosopher H. J. McCloskey as his two most important mentors. 

One day at Balliol College in Oxford, he had what he refers to as probably the decisive formative experience of his life. He was having a discussion after class with fellow graduate student Richard Keshen, a Canadian, who would later become a professor at Cape Breton University. During their lunch Keshen opted to have a salad after being told that the spaghetti sauce contained meat. Singer had the spaghetti. Singer eventually questioned Keshen about his reason for avoiding meat. Keshen explained his ethical objections. Singer would later state, "I'd never met a vegetarian who gave such a straightforward answer that I could understand and relate to". Keshen later introduced Singer to his vegetarian friends. Singer was able to find one book in which he could read up on the issue (Animal Machines by Ruth Harrison) and within a week or two he approached his wife saying that he thought they needed to make a change to their diet and that he did not think they could justify eating meat.

After spending three years as a Radcliffe lecturer at University College, Oxford, he was a visiting professor at New York University for 16 months. In 1977 he returned to Melbourne where he spent most of his career, aside from appointments as visiting faculty abroad, until his move to Princeton in 1999. In June 2011 it was announced he would join the professoriate of New College of the Humanities, a private college in London, in addition to his work at Princeton. He also has been a regular contributor to Project Syndicate since 2001.

According to philosopher Helga Kuhse, Singer is almost certainly the best-known and most widely read of all contemporary philosophers. Michael Specter wrote that Singer is among the most influential of contemporary philosophers.

Applied ethics 

Singer's Practical Ethics (1979) analyzes why and how living beings' interests should be weighed. His principle of equal consideration of interests does not dictate equal treatment of all those with interests, since different interests warrant different treatment. All have an interest in avoiding pain, for instance, but relatively few have an interest in cultivating their abilities. Not only does his principle justify different treatment for different interests, but it allows different treatment for the same interest when diminishing marginal utility is a factor. For example, this approach would privilege a starving person's interest in food over the same interest of someone who is only slightly hungry.

Among the more important human interests are those in avoiding pain, in developing one's abilities, in satisfying basic needs for food and shelter, in enjoying warm personal relationships, in being free to pursue one's projects without interference, "and many others". The fundamental interest that entitles a being to equal consideration is the capacity for "suffering and/or enjoyment or happiness". Singer holds that a being's interests should always be weighed according to that being's concrete properties. He favors a "journey" model of life, which measures the wrongness of taking a life by the degree to which doing so frustrates a life journey's goals. So taking a life is less wrong at the beginning, when no goals have been set, and at the end, when the goals have either been met or are unlikely to be accomplished. The journey model is tolerant of some frustrated desire and explains why persons who have embarked on their journeys are not replaceable. Only a personal interest in continuing to live brings the journey model into play. This model also explains the priority that Singer attaches to interests over trivial desires and pleasures.

Ethical conduct is justified by reasons that go beyond prudence to "something bigger than the individual", addressing a larger audience. Singer thinks this going-beyond identifies moral reasons as "somehow universal", specifically in the injunction to 'love thy neighbour as thyself', interpreted by him as demanding that one give the same weight to the interests of others as one gives to one's own interests. This universalising step, which Singer traces from Kant to Hare, is crucial and sets him apart from those moral theorists, from Hobbes to David Gauthier, who tie morality to prudence. Universalisation leads directly to utilitarianism, Singer argues, on the strength of the thought that one's own interests cannot count for more than the interests of others.

Taking these into account, one must weigh them up and adopt the course of action that is most likely to maximise the interests of those affected; utilitarianism has been arrived at. Singer's universalising step applies to interests without reference to who has them, whereas the Kantian's applies to the judgments of rational agents (in Kant's kingdom of Ends, or Rawls's original position, etc.). Singer regards Kantian universalisation as unjust to animals. As for the Hobbesians, Singer attempts a response in the final chapter of Practical Ethics, arguing that self-interested reasons support adoption of the moral point of view, such as 'the paradox of hedonism', which counsels that happiness is best found by not looking for it, and the need most people feel to relate to something larger than their own concerns.

Singer identifies as a sentientist. Sentientism is a naturalistic worldview that grants moral consideration to all sentient beings.

Effective altruism and world poverty 

Singer's ideas have contributed to the rise of effective altruism. He argues that people should try not only to reduce suffering but to reduce it in the most effective manner possible. While Singer has previously written at length about the moral imperative to reduce poverty and eliminate the suffering of nonhuman animals, particularly in the meat industry, he writes about how the effective altruism movement is doing these things more effectively in his 2015 book The Most Good You Can Do. He is a board member of Animal Charity Evaluators, a charity evaluator used by many members of the effective altruism community which recommends the most cost-effective animal advocacy charities and interventions.

His own organisation, The Life You Can Save, also recommends a selection of charities deemed by charity evaluators such as GiveWell to be the most effective when it comes to helping those in extreme poverty. TLYCS was founded after Singer released his 2009 eponymous book, in which he argues more generally in favour of giving to charities that help to end global poverty. In particular, he expands upon some of the arguments made in his 1972 essay "Famine, Affluence, and Morality", in which he posits that citizens of rich nations are morally obligated to give at least some of their disposable income to charities that help the global poor. He supports this using the "drowning child analogy", which states that most people would rescue a drowning child from a pond, even if it meant that their expensive clothes were ruined, so we clearly value a human life more than the value of our material possessions. As a result, we should take a significant portion of the money that we spend on our possessions and instead donate it to charity.

Since November 2009, Singer is a member of Giving What We Can, an international organization whose members pledge to give at least 10% of their income to effective charities.

Animal liberation and speciesism 

Published in 1975, Animal Liberation has been cited as a formative influence on leaders of the modern animal liberation movement. The central argument of the book is an expansion of the utilitarian concept that "the greatest good of the greatest number" is the only measure of good or ethical behaviour, and Singer believes that there is no reason not to apply this principle to other animals, arguing that the boundary between human and "animal" is completely arbitrary. There are far more differences between a great ape and an oyster, for example, than between a human and a great ape, and yet the former two are lumped together as "animals", whereas we are considered "human" in a way that supposedly differentiates us from all other "animals."

He popularised the term "speciesism", which had been coined by English writer Richard D. Ryder to describe the practice of privileging humans over other animals, and therefore argues in favour of the equal consideration of interests of all sentient beings. In Animal Liberation, Singer argues in favour of veganism and against animal experimentation. Singer describes himself as a flexible vegan. He writes, "I am largely vegan but I'm a flexible vegan. I don't go to the supermarket and buy non-vegan stuff for myself. But when I'm traveling or going to other people's places I will be quite happy to eat vegetarian rather than vegan."

In an article for the online publication Chinadialogue, Singer called Western-style meat production cruel, unhealthy, and damaging to the ecosystem. He rejected the idea that the method was necessary to meet the population's increasing demand, explaining that animals in factory farms have to eat food grown explicitly for them, and they burn up most of the food's energy just to breathe and keep their bodies warm. In a 2010 Guardian article he titled, "Fish: the forgotten victims on our plate", Singer drew attention to the welfare of fish. He quoted author Alison Mood's startling statistics from a report she wrote, which was released on fishcount.org.uk just a month before the Guardian article. Singer states that she "has put together what may well be the first-ever systematic estimate of the size of the annual global capture of wild fish. It is, she calculates, in the order of one trillion, although it could be as high as 2.7tn."

Some chapters of Animal Liberation are dedicated to criticising testing on animals but, unlike groups such as PETA, Singer is willing to accept such testing when there is a clear benefit for medicine. In November 2006, Singer appeared on the BBC programme Monkeys, Rats and Me: Animal Testing and said that he felt that Tipu Aziz's experiments on monkeys for research into treating Parkinson's disease could be justified. Whereas Singer has continued since the publication of Animal Liberation to promote vegetarianism and veganism, he has been much less vocal in recent years on the subject of animal experimentation.

Singer has defended some of the actions of the Animal Liberation Front, such as the stealing of footage from Dr. Thomas Gennarelli's laboratory in May 1984 (as shown in the documentary Unnecessary Fuss), but he has condemned other actions such as the use of explosives by some animal-rights activists and sees the freeing of captive animals as largely futile when they are easily replaced.

Singer features in the 2017 documentary Empathy, directed by Ed Antoja, which aims to promote a more respectful way of life towards all animals. The documentary won the "Public Choice Award" of the Greenpeace Film Festival.

Other views

Meta-ethical views 

In the past, Singer has not held that objective moral values exist, on the basis that reason could favor both egoism and equal consideration of interests. Singer himself adopted utilitarianism on the basis that people's preferences can be universalised, leading to a situation where one takes the "point of view of the universe" and "an impartial standpoint". But in the Second Edition of Practical Ethics, he concedes that the question of why we should act morally "cannot be given an answer that will provide everyone with overwhelming reasons for acting morally".

However, when co-authoring The Point of View of the Universe (2014), Singer shifted to the position that objective moral values do exist, and defends the 19th century utilitarian philosopher Henry Sidgwick's view that objective morality can be derived from fundamental moral axioms that are knowable by reason. Additionally, he endorses Derek Parfit's view that there are object-given reasons for action. Furthermore, Singer and Katarzyna de Lazari-Radek (the co-author of the book) argue that evolutionary debunking arguments can be used to demonstrate that it is more rational to take the impartial standpoint of "the point of view of the universe", as opposed to egoism—pursuing one's own self-interest—because the existence of egoism is more likely to be the product of evolution by natural selection, rather than because it is correct, whereas taking an impartial standpoint and equally considering the interests of all sentient beings is in conflict with what we would expect from natural selection, meaning that it is more likely that impartiality in ethics is the correct stance to pursue.

Political views 

Whilst a student in Melbourne, Singer campaigned against the Vietnam War as president of the Melbourne University Campaign Against Conscription. He also spoke publicly for the legalisation of abortion in Australia.
Singer joined the Australian Labor Party in 1974, but resigned after disillusionment with the centrist leadership of Bob Hawke. In 1992, he became a founding member of the Victorian Greens. He has run for political office twice for the Greens: in 1994 he received 28% of the vote in the Kooyong by-election, and in 1996 he received 3% of the vote when running for the Senate (elected by proportional representation). Before the 1996 election, he co-authored a book The Greens with Bob Brown.

In A Darwinian Left, Singer outlines a plan for the political left to adapt to the lessons of evolutionary biology. He says that evolutionary psychology suggests that humans naturally tend to be self-interested. He further argues that the evidence that selfish tendencies are natural must not be taken as evidence that selfishness is "right." He concludes that game theory (the mathematical study of strategy) and experiments in psychology offer hope that self-interested people will make short-term sacrifices for the good of others, if society provides the right conditions. Essentially, Singer claims that although humans possess selfish, competitive tendencies naturally, they have a substantial capacity for cooperation that also has been selected for during human evolution. Singer's writing in Greater Good magazine, published by the Greater Good Science Center of the University of California, Berkeley, includes the interpretation of scientific research into the roots of compassion, altruism, and peaceful human relationships.

Singer has criticised the United States for receiving "oil from countries run by dictators ... who pocket most of the" financial gains, thus "keeping the people in poverty." Singer believes that the wealth of these countries "should belong to the people" within them rather than their "de facto government. In paying dictators for their oil, we are in effect buying stolen goods, and helping to keep people in poverty." Singer holds that America "should be doing more to assist people in extreme poverty". He is disappointed in U.S. foreign aid policy, deeming it "a very small proportion of our GDP, less than a quarter of some other affluent nations." Singer maintains that little "private philanthropy from the U.S." is "directed to helping people in extreme poverty, although there are some exceptions, most notably, of course, the Gates Foundation."

Singer describes himself as not anti-capitalist, stating in a 2010 interview with the New Left Project:

Capitalism is very far from a perfect system, but so far we have yet to find anything that clearly does a better job of meeting human needs than a regulated capitalist economy coupled with a welfare and health care system that meets the basic needs of those who do not thrive in the capitalist economy.

He added that "[i]f we ever do find a better system, I'll be happy to call myself an anti-capitalist".

Similarly, in his book Marx, Singer is sympathetic to Marx's criticism of capitalism, but is skeptical about whether a better system is likely to be created, writing: "Marx saw that capitalism is a wasteful, irrational system, a system which controls us when we should be controlling it. That insight is still valid; but we can now see that the construction of a free and equal society is a more difficult task than Marx realised."

Singer is opposed to the death penalty, claiming that it does not effectively deter the crimes for which it is the punitive measure, and that he cannot see any other justification for it.

In 2010, Singer signed a petition renouncing his right of return to Israel, because it is "a form of racist privilege that abets the colonial oppression of the Palestinians."

In 2016, Singer called on Jill Stein to withdraw from the US presidential election in states that were close between Hillary Clinton and Donald Trump, on the grounds that "The stakes are too high". He argued against the view that there was no significant difference between Clinton and Trump, whilst also saying that he would not advocate such a tactic in Australia's electoral system, which allows for ranking of preferences.

When writing in 2017 on Trump's denial of climate change and plans to withdraw from the Paris accords, Singer advocated a boycott of all consumer goods from the United States to pressure the Trump administration to change its environmental policies.

In 2021, Singer described the War on Drugs as an expensive, ineffective and extremely harmful policy.

Euthanasia and infanticide 

Singer holds that the right to life is essentially tied to a being's capacity to hold preferences, which in turn is essentially tied to a being's capacity to feel pain and pleasure.

In Practical Ethics, Singer argues in favour of abortion rights on the grounds that fetuses are neither rational nor self-aware, and can therefore hold no preferences. As a result, he argues that the preference of a mother to have an abortion automatically takes precedence. In sum, Singer argues that a fetus lacks personhood.

Similar to his argument for abortion rights, Singer argues that newborns lack the essential characteristics of personhood—"rationality, autonomy, and self-consciousness"—and therefore "killing a newborn baby is never equivalent to killing a person, that is, a being who wants to go on living". Singer has clarified that his "view of when life begins isn't very different from that of opponents of abortion." He deems it not "unreasonable to hold that an individual human life begins at conception. If it doesn't, then it begins about 14 days later, when it is no longer possible for the embryo to divide into twins or other multiples." Singer disagrees with abortion rights opponents in that he does not "think that the fact that an embryo is a living human being is sufficient to show that it is wrong to kill it." Singer wishes "to see American jurisprudence, and the national abortion debate, take up the question of which capacities a human being needs to have in order for it to be wrong to kill it" as well as "when, in the development of the early human being, these capacities are present."

Singer classifies euthanasia as voluntary, involuntary, or non-voluntary. Voluntary euthanasia is that to which the subject consents. He argues in favour of voluntary euthanasia and some forms of non-voluntary euthanasia, including infanticide in certain instances, but opposes involuntary euthanasia. 

Bioethicists associated with the disability rights and disability studies communities have argued that his epistemology is based on ableist conceptions of disability. Singer's positions have also been criticised by some advocates for disability rights and right-to-life supporters, concerned with what they see as his attacks upon human dignity. Religious critics have argued that Singer's ethics ignores and undermines the traditional notion of the sanctity of life. Singer agrees and believes the notion of the sanctity of life ought to be discarded as outdated, unscientific, and irrelevant to understanding problems in contemporary bioethics. Disability rights activists have held many protests against Singer at Princeton University and at his lectures over the years. Singer has replied that many people judge him based on secondhand summaries and short quotations taken out of context, not on his books or articles, and that his aim is to elevate the status of animals, not to lower that of humans. 

American publisher Steve Forbes ceased his donations to Princeton University in 1999 because of Singer's appointment to a prestigious professorship. Nazi-hunter Simon Wiesenthal wrote to organisers of a Swedish book fair to which Singer was invited that "A professor of morals ... who justifies the right to kill handicapped newborns ... is in my opinion unacceptable for representation at your level." Marc Maurer, president of the National Federation of the Blind, criticised Singer's appointment to the Princeton faculty in a banquet speech at the organisation's national convention in July 2001, claiming that Singer's support for euthanising disabled babies could lead to disabled older children and adults being valued less as well. Conservative psychiatrist Theodore Dalrymple wrote in 2010 that Singerian moral universalism is "preposterous—psychologically, theoretically, and practically".

In 2002, disability rights activist Harriet McBryde Johnson debated Singer, challenging his belief that it is morally permissible to euthanise newborn children with severe disabilities. "Unspeakable Conversations", Johnson's account of her encounters with Singer and the pro-euthanasia movement, was published in the New York Times Magazine in 2003.

In 2015, Singer debated Archbishop Anthony Fisher on the legalisation of euthanasia at Sydney Town Hall. Singer rejected arguments that legalising euthanasia would result in a slippery slope where the practice might become widespread as a means to remove undesirable people for financial or other motives.

Singer has experienced the complexities of some of these questions in his own life. His mother had Alzheimer's disease. He said, "I think this has made me see how the issues of someone with these kinds of problems are really very difficult". In an interview with Ronald Bailey, published in December 2000, he explained that his sister shares the responsibility of making decisions about his mother. He did say that, if he were solely responsible, his mother might not continue to live.

Surrogacy 
In 1985, Singer wrote a book with the physician Deanne Wells arguing that surrogate motherhood should be allowed and regulated by the state by establishing nonprofit 'State Surrogacy Boards', which would ensure fairness between surrogate mothers and surrogacy-seeking parents. Singer and Wells endorsed both the payment of medical expenses endured by surrogate mothers and an extra "fair fee" to compensate the surrogate mother.

Religion 

Singer was a speaker at the 2012 Global Atheist Convention. He has debated with Christians including John Lennox and Dinesh D'Souza. Singer has pointed to the problem of evil as an objection against the Christian conception of God. He stated: "The evidence of our own eyes makes it more plausible to believe that the world was not created by any god at all. If, however, we insist on believing in divine creation, we are forced to admit that the god who made the world cannot be all-powerful and all good. He must be either evil or a bungler." In keeping with his considerations of nonhuman animals, Singer also takes issue with the original sin reply to the problem of evil, saying that, "animals also suffer from floods, fires, and droughts, and, since they are not descended from Adam and Eve, they cannot have inherited original sin."

Medical intervention in the aging process
Singer supports the view that medical intervention into the aging process would do more to improve human life than research on therapies for specific chronic diseases in the developed world:

Singer does worry that "If we discover how to slow aging, we might have a world in which the poor majority must face death at a time when members of the rich minority are only a 10th of the way through their expected lifespans," thus risking "that overcoming aging will increase the stock of injustice in the world." However, Singer cautiously highlights that as with other medical developments, they will reach the more economically disadvantaged over time once developed, whereas they can never do so if they are not. As to the concern that longer lives might contribute to overpopulation, Singer notes that "success in overcoming aging could itself ... delay or eliminate menopause, enabling women to have their first children much later than they can now" and thus slowing the birth rate, and also that technology may reduce the consequences of rising human populations by (for instance) enabling more zero-greenhouse gas energy sources.

In 2012, Singer's department sponsored the "Science and Ethics of Eliminating Aging" seminar at Princeton.

Protests

In 1989 and 1990, Singer's work was the subject of a number of protests in Germany. A course in ethics led by Hartmut Kliemt at the University of Duisburg where the main text used was Singer's Practical Ethics was, according to Singer, "subjected to organised and repeated disruption by protesters objecting to the use of the book on the grounds that in one of its ten chapters it advocates active euthanasia for severely disabled newborn infants". The protests led to the course being shut down.

When Singer tried to speak during a lecture at Saarbrücken, he was interrupted by a group of protesters including advocates for disability rights. One of the protesters expressed that entering serious discussions would be a tactical error.

The same year, Singer was invited to speak in Marburg at a European symposium on "Bioengineering, Ethics and Mental Disability". The invitation was fiercely attacked by leading intellectuals and organisations in the German media, with an article in Der Spiegel comparing Singer's positions to Nazism. Eventually, the symposium was cancelled and Singer's invitation withdrawn.

A lecture at the Zoological Institute of the University of Zurich was interrupted by two groups of protesters. The first group was a group of disabled people who staged a brief protest at the beginning of the lecture. They objected to inviting an advocate of euthanasia to speak. At the end of this protest, when Singer tried to address their concerns, a second group of protesters rose and began chanting "Singer raus! Singer raus!" ("Singer out!" in German) When Singer attempted to respond, a protester jumped on stage and grabbed his glasses, and the host ended the lecture. Singer explains "my views are not threatening to anyone, even minimally" and says that some groups play on the anxieties of those who hear only keywords that are understandably worrying (given the constant fears of ever repeating the Holocaust) if taken with any less than the full context of his belief system.

Singer has stated that threats were made to Adolf Hübner, then the president of the Austrian Ludwig Wittgenstein Society, that the conference would be disrupted if Singer and Meggle were given a platform. Hübner proposed to the board of the society that Singer's invitation (as well as the invitations of a number of other speakers) be withdrawn. The Society decided to cancel the symposium.

In an article originally published in The New York Review of Books, Singer argued that the protests dramatically increased the amount of coverage he received: "instead of a few hundred people hearing views at lectures in Marburg and Dortmund, several millions read about them or listened to them on television". Despite this, Singer argues that it has led to a difficult intellectual climate, with professors in Germany unable to teach courses on applied ethics and campaigns demanding the resignation of professors who invited Singer to speak.

Criticism 
Singer was criticised by Nathan J. Robinson, founder of Current Affairs, for comments in an op-ed defending Anna Stubblefield, a carer and professor who was convicted of aggravated sexual assault against a man with severe physical and intellectual disabilities. The op-ed questioned whether the victim was capable of giving or withholding consent, and stated that "It seems reasonable to assume that the experience was pleasurable to him; for even if he is cognitively impaired, he was capable of struggling to resist." Robinson called the statements "outrageous" and "morally repulsive", and said that they implied that it might be permissible to rape or sexually assault disabled people.

Roger Scruton was critical of the consequentialist, utilitarian approach of Peter Singer. Scruton alleged that Singer's works, including Animal Liberation (1975), "contain little or no philosophical argument. They derive their radical moral conclusions from a vacuous utilitarianism that counts the pain and pleasure of all living things as equally significant and that ignores just about everything that has been said in our philosophical tradition about the real distinction between persons and animals."

Anthropologists have criticised Singer's foundational essay "Animal Liberation" (1973) for comparing the interests of "slum children" with the interests of the rats that bite them – at a time when poor and predominantly Black American children were indeed regularly attacked and bitten by rats, sometimes fatally.

Recognition 
Singer was inducted into the United States Animal Rights Hall of Fame in 2000.

In June 2012, Singer was appointed a Companion of the Order of Australia (AC) for "eminent service to philosophy and bioethics as a leader of public debate and communicator of ideas in the areas of global poverty, animal welfare and the human condition."

Singer received Philosophy Nows 2016 Award for Contributions in the Fight Against Stupidity for his efforts "to disturb the comfortable complacency with which many of us habitually ignore the desperate needs of others ... particularly for this work as it relates to the Effective Altruism movement."

In 2018, Singer was noted in the book, Rescuing Ladybugs by author and animal advocate Jennifer Skiff as a "hero among heroes in the world," who, in arguing against speciesism "gave the modern world permission to believe what we innately know – that animals are sentient and that we have a moral obligation not to exploit or mistreat them." The book states that Singer's "moral philosophy on animal equality was sparked when he asked a fellow student at Oxford University a simple question about his eating habits."

In 2021, Singer was awarded the US$1-million Berggruen Prize, and decided to give it away. 
He decided, in particular, to give half of the prize money to his foundation The Life You Can Save, because "over the last three years, each dollar spent by it generated an average of $17 in donations for its recommended nonprofits". (He added he has never taken money for personal use from the organization.) 
Moreover, he plans to donate more than a third of the money to organizations combating intensive animal farming, and recommended as effective by Animal Charity Evaluators.

For 2022 Singer received the BBVA Foundation Frontiers of Knowledge Award in the category of "Humanities and Social Sciences".

Personal life
Since 1968, he has been married to Renata Singer (née Diamond; b. 1947 Wałbrzych, Poland); they have three children: Ruth, a textile artist; Marion, law student and youth arts specialist; and Esther, linguist and teacher. Renata Singer is a novelist and author and has collaborated on publications with her husband. Until 2021 she was President of the Kadimah Jewish Cultural Centre and National Library in Melbourne.

Publications

Singly authored books 
 Democracy and Disobedience, Clarendon Press, Oxford, 1973; Oxford University Press, New York, 1974; Gregg Revivals, Aldershot, Hampshire, 1994
 Animal Liberation: A New Ethics for our Treatment of Animals, New York Review/Random House, New York, 1975; Cape, London, 1976; Avon, New York, 1977; Paladin, London, 1977; Thorsons, London, 1983. Harper Perennial Modern Classics, New York, 2002. Harper Perennial Modern Classics, New York, 2009.
 Practical Ethics, Cambridge University Press, Cambridge, 1980; second edition, 1993; third edition, 2011.
 Marx, Oxford University Press, Oxford, 1980; Hill & Wang, New York, 1980; reissued as Marx: A Very Short Introduction, Oxford University Press, 2000; also included in full in K. Thomas (ed.), Great Political Thinkers: Machiavelli, Hobbes, Mill and Marx, Oxford University Press, Oxford, 1992
 The Expanding Circle: Ethics and Sociobiology, Farrar, Straus and Giroux, New York, 1981; Oxford University Press, Oxford, 1981; New American Library, New York, 1982. 
 Hegel, Oxford University Press, Oxford and New York, 1982; reissued as Hegel: A Very Short Introduction, Oxford University Press, 2001; also included in full in German Philosophers: Kant, Hegel, Schopenhauer, Nietzsche, Oxford University Press, Oxford, 1997
 How Are We to Live? Ethics in an Age of Self-interest, Text Publishing, Melbourne, 1993; Mandarin, London, 1995; Prometheus, Buffalo, NY, 1995; Oxford University Press, Oxford, 1997
 Rethinking Life and Death: The Collapse of Our Traditional Ethics, Text Publishing, Melbourne, 1994; St Martin's Press, New York, 1995; reprint 2008.  Oxford University Press, Oxford, 1995
 Ethics into Action: Henry Spira and the Animal Rights Movement, Rowman and Littlefield, Lanham, Maryland, 1998; Melbourne University Press, Melbourne, 1999
 A Darwinian Left, Weidenfeld and Nicolson, London, 1999; Yale University Press, New Haven, 2000. 
 One World: The Ethics of Globalisation, Yale University Press, New Haven, 2002; Text Publishing, Melbourne, 2002; 2nd edition, pb, Yale University Press, 2004; Oxford Longman, Hyderabad, 2004. 
 Pushing Time Away: My Grandfather and the Tragedy of Jewish Vienna, Ecco Press, New York, 2003; HarperCollins Australia, Melbourne, 2003; Granta, London, 2004
 The President of Good and Evil: The Ethics of George W. Bush, Dutton, New York, 2004; Granta, London, 2004; Text, Melbourne, 2004. 
 The Life You Can Save: Acting Now to End World Poverty. New York: Random House 2009.
 The Most Good You Can Do: How Effective Altruism Is Changing Ideas About Living Ethically. Yale University Press, 2015.
 Ethics in the Real World: 82 Brief Essays on Things That Matter. Princeton University Press, 2016.
 Why Vegan? Eating Ethically. Liveright, 2020.

Coauthored books 
 Animal Factories (co-author with James Mason), Crown, New York, 1980
 The Reproduction Revolution: New Ways of Making Babies (co-author with Deane Wells), Oxford University Press, Oxford, 1984. revised American edition, Making Babies, Scribner's New York, 1986
 Animal Liberation: A Graphic Guide (co-author with Lori Gruen), Camden Press, London, 1987
 Should the Baby Live? The Problem of Handicapped Infants (co-author with Helga Kuhse), Oxford University Press, Oxford, 1985; Oxford University Press, New York, 1986; Gregg Revivals, Aldershot, Hampshire, 1994. 
 Ethical and Legal Issues in Guardianship Options for Intellectually Disadvantaged People (co-author with Terry Carney), Human Rights Commission Monograph Series, no. 2, Australian Government Publishing Service, Canberra, 1986
 How Ethical is Australia? An Examination of Australia's Record as a Global Citizen (with Tom Gregg), Black Inc, Melbourne, 2004
 The Ethics of What We Eat: Why Our Food Choices Matter (or The Way We Eat: Why Our Food Choices Matter), Rodale, New York, 2006 (co-author with Jim Mason); Text, Melbourne; Random House, London. Audio version: Playaway. 
 Eating (co-authored with Jim Mason), Arrow, London, 2006
 Stem Cell Research: the ethical issues. (co-edited by Lori Gruen, Laura Grabel, and Peter Singer). New York: Blackwells. 2007.
 The Future of Animal Farming: Renewing the Ancient Contract (with Marian Stamp Dawkins, and Roland Bonney) 2008. New York: Wiley-Blackwell.
 The Point of View of the Universe: Sidgwick and Contemporary Ethics (with Katarzyna de Lazari-Radek), Oxford University Press, 2014
 Utilitarianism: A Very Short Introduction (with Katarzyna de Lazari-Radek), Oxford University Press, 2017

Edited and coedited volumes and anthologies 
 Test-Tube Babies: a guide to moral questions, present techniques, and future possibilities (co-edited with William Walters), Oxford University Press, Melbourne, 1982
 Animal Rights and Human Obligations: An Anthology (co-editor with Tom Regan), Prentice-Hall, New Jersey, 1976. 2nd revised edition, Prentice-Hall, New Jersey, 1989
 In Defence of Animals (ed.), Blackwells, Oxford, 1985; Harper & Row, New York, 1986. 
 Applied Ethics (ed.), Oxford University Press, Oxford, 1986
 Embryo Experimentation (co-editor with Helga Kuhse, Stephen Buckle, Karen Dawson and Pascal Kasimba), Cambridge University Press, Cambridge, 1990; paperback edition, updated, 1993
 A Companion to Ethics (ed.), Basil Blackwell, Oxford, 1991; paperback edition, 1993
 Save the Animals! (Australian edition, co-author with Barbara Dover and Ingrid Newkirk), Collins Angus & Robertson, North Ryde, NSW, 1991
 The Great Ape Project: Equality Beyond Humanity (co-editor with Paola Cavalieri), Fourth Estate, London, 1993; hardback, St Martin's Press, New York, 1994; paperback, St Martin's Press, New York, 1995
 Ethics (ed.), Oxford University Press, Oxford, 1994
 Individuals, Humans and Persons: Questions of Life and Death (co-author with Helga Kuhse), Academia Verlag, Sankt Augustin, Germany, 1994
 The Greens (co-author with Bob Brown), Text Publishing, Melbourne, 1996
 The Allocation of Health Care Resources: An Ethical Evaluation of the "QALY" Approach (co-author with John McKie, Jeff Richardson and Helga Kuhse), Ashgate/Dartmouth, Aldershot, 1998
 A Companion to Bioethics (co-editor with Helga Kuhse), Blackwell, Oxford, 1998
 Bioethics. An Anthology (co-editor with Helga Kuhse), Blackwell, 1999/ Oxford, 2006
 The Moral of the Story: An Anthology of Ethics Through Literature (co-edited with Renata Singer), Blackwell, Oxford, 2005
 In Defense of Animals. The Second Wave (ed.), Blackwell, Oxford, 2005
 The Bioethics Reader: Editors' Choice. (co-editor with Ruth Chadwick, Helga Kuhse, Willem Landman and Udo Schüklenk). New York: Blackwell, 2007
 J. M. Coetzee and Ethics: Philosophical Perspectives on Literature (co-editor with A. Leist), New York: Columbia University Press, 2010
 The Golden Ass, by Apuleius (edited and abridged by Peter Singer, translated by Ellen D. Finkelpearl), New York: Liveright Publishing Corporation; London: W.W. Norton and Company, Ltd., 2021

Anthologies of Singer's work 
 Writings on an Ethical Life, Ecco, New York, 2000; Fourth Estate, London, 2001. 
 Unsanctifying Human Life: Essays on Ethics (edited by Helga Kuhse), Blackwell, Oxford, 2001

Commentary volumes on Singer's work 
 Jamieson, Dale (ed.). Singer and His Critics. Wiley-Blackwell, 1999
 Schaler, Jeffrey A. (ed.). Peter Singer Under Fire: The Moral Iconoclast Faces His Critics. Chicago: Open Court Publishers, 2009
 Davidow, Ben (ed.). "Peter Singer" Uncaged: Top Activists Share Their Wisdom on Effective Farm Animal Advocacy. Davidow Press, 2013

See also 
  Animal liberation movement
  Animal liberationist
  Argument from marginal cases
  Demandingness objection
  Effective altruism
  Intrinsic value (animal ethics)
  List of animal rights advocates
  Utilitarian bioethics
  Utilitarianism
  Veganism

References

External links 

 
 Column archive at Project Syndicate
 
 
 An in-depth autobiographical interview with Singer
Peter Singer, biographical profile, including quotes and further resources, at Utilitarianism.net.

 
1946 births
Living people
20th-century Australian non-fiction writers
20th-century Australian philosophers
21st-century Australian non-fiction writers
21st-century Australian philosophers
Academics from Melbourne
Alumni of University College, Oxford
Analytic philosophers
Animal ethicists
Animal rights scholars
Animal welfare scholars
Ethicists
Atheist philosophers
Australian animal rights activists
Australian atheists
Australian ethicists
Australian Greens candidates
Australian humanists
Australian male non-fiction writers
Australian people of Austrian-Jewish descent
Australian social commentators
Bioethicists
Carnegie Council for Ethics in International Affairs
Companions of the Order of Australia
Consequentialists
Environmental philosophers
Epistemologists
Jewish atheists
Jewish Australian writers
Jewish philosophers
Metaphysicians
Academic staff of Monash University
New York University faculty
Ontologists
People associated with effective altruism
People associated with the Oxford Group (animal rights)
People educated at Scotch College, Melbourne
Philosophers of culture
Philosophers of education
Philosophers of mind
Philosophers of science
Philosophers of sexuality
Philosophers of technology
Philosophy writers
Political philosophers
Princeton University faculty
Sentientists
Social philosophers
University of Melbourne alumni
Academic staff of the University of Melbourne
Utilitarians
Vegetarianism activists
Writers from Melbourne